Three Creek is a nearly 47 mile (75.4 km) long tributary of the Nottoway River in southeastern Virginia in the United States.

Course
Three Creek is formed at the confluence of Tryall Creek and Cooks Branch in Greensville County, Virginia.  From the confluence, the creek flows east then south into Slagles Lake.  After Slagles Lake it flows further south for about a mile and then flows roughly southeast and then northeast through swampland towards the Nottoway River.  Three Creek forms the county boundary between Greensville and Sussex Counties for part of its course.

Sources
Tryall Creek rises from about 290 feet amsl near Pleasant Grove Church and flows northeast to meet Cooks Branch.  Cooks Branch rises near Smoky Ordinary at about 315 feet amsl and flows east then south to meet with Tryall Creek.  Cooks Branch has one tributary called Kettlestick Branch that comes in on the left.

Watershed
Three Creek drains a mostly forested watershed and contains a lot of swampland towards the Nottoway River.  Agriculture makes a large amount of the rest of the area.

River Modifications
Three Creek has one impoundment, Slagles Lake along its course.  A number of the tributaries have their own impoundments.

Geology
The confluence of Tryall Creek and Cooks Branch is in the Piedmont of Virginia in mafic and felsic metavolcanic rocks.  Both tributaries arise in granite (Tryall Creek) or granite gneiss (Cooks Branch).  Three Creek flows into the Coastal Plain in the Bacon Castle Formation and then for most of its length, especially the swampy areas it is in alluvium.

See also
List of rivers of Virginia

References

USGS Geographic Names Information Service
USGS Hydrologic Unit Map - State of Virginia (1974)

Rivers of Virginia
Tributaries of Albemarle Sound